Montpezat is a commune in the Gard department in southern France.

Population

See also
Communes of the Gard department

References

External links

 Official site 

Communes of Gard